Carolina del Valle Cerruti Duijm (born 1962 in Caracas, Venezuela) is Miss World Venezuela 1983 and the daughter of former Miss World 1955, Susana Duijm.

Miss World Venezuela
Cerruti competed in 1983 as Miss Apure in her country's national beauty pageant, Miss Venezuela, becoming first runner-up and gaining the right to be Venezuela's official representative to the Miss World pageant held in London, United Kingdom on November 17, 1983.

References

External links
Miss Venezuela Official Website
Miss World Official Website

1962 births
Living people
People from Caracas
Miss World 1983 delegates
Miss Venezuela World winners